All Blues is an album by the GRP All-Star Big Band that won the Grammy Award for Best Large Jazz Ensemble Performance in 1996.

Track listing

Personnel

 Tom Scott – conductor, soprano saxophone, tenor saxophone, baritone saxophone
 Ernie Watts – soprano saxophone, tenor saxophone
 Eric Marienthal – alto saxophone, soprano saxophone
 Nelson Rangell – flute, alto saxophone, soprano saxophone
 Bob Mintzer – bass clarinet, soprano saxophone, tenor saxophone
 Randy Brecker – flugelhorn, trumpet
 Arturo Sandoval – flugelhorn, trumpet
 Chuck Findley – flugelhorn, trumpet
 George Bohanon – trombone
 John Patitucci – double bass, bass guitar
 Dave Grusin – piano
 Chick Corea – piano
 Ramsey Lewis – piano
 Russell Ferrante – Hammond organ, piano
 B.B. King – guitar, vocals
 Dave Weckl – drums
 Dave Grusin, Larry Rosen –  executive producers
 Michael Abene – producer
 Bernie Kirsh – engineer
 Ted Jensen –  mastering

References

Big band albums
Jazz albums by American artists
Grammy Award for Best Large Jazz Ensemble Album
GRP Records albums